The Leading Group on Innovative Financing for Development is a global platform made up of 55 member countries with differing levels of development, operating alongside international organisations and NGOs.  Formerly known as the Leading Group on Solidarity Levies to Fund Development, the Leading Group seeks to promote the implementation and definition of innovative financing mechanisms around the world.

Formed in 2006, the Leading Group is coordinated by the Permanent Secretariat which is located in Paris at the French Ministry of Foreign and European Affairs.

Membership 

The following countries are currently members of the Leading Group:

Algeria, Bangladesh, Belgium, Benin, Brazil, Burkina Faso, Cambodia, Cameroon, Cape Verde, Central African Republic, Chile, Congo, Cote d’Ivoire, Cyprus, Djibouti, Ethiopia, European Commission, Finland, France, Gabon, Germany, Georgia, Guatemala, Guinea, Haiti, India, Italy, Japan, Jordan, Lebanon, Liberia, Luxembourg, Madagascar, Mali, Mauritania, Mauritius, Mexico, Morocco, Mozambique, Namibia, Nicaragua, Niger, Nigeria, Norway, Poland, the Republic of Korea, Romania, Sao Tome and Principe, Saudi Arabia, Senegal, Sierra Leone, South Africa, Spain, Togo, United Kingdom and Uruguay.

The following countries serve as observer countries in the Leading Group:
Austria, China, Egypt and Romania

The following international organisations are currently members of the Leading Group:
United Nations
African Development Bank
World Bank
Inter-American Development Bank
Asian Development Bank
FAO
International Monetary Fund
United Nations Population Fund (UNPF)
The Global Fund
OECD
WHO
UNAIDS
WFP
International Fund for Agricultural Development (IFAD)
United Nations Procurement Division (UNPD)
UNICEF

External links 
 Official website
 Le site officiel
 Página web oficial

Economic development organizations
International development agencies
International economic organizations
Organizations established in 2006
Organizations based in Paris